Leucopaxillus is a species of fungus in the family Tricholomataceae, and the type species of the genus Leucopaxillus. It was first described as Clitocybe paradoxa in 1896, and transferred to the newly created Leucopaxillus in 1925. It is found in Asia, Europe, and North America.

References

External links

Mushroomhobby.com Images

Tricholomataceae
Fungi described in 1896
Fungi of Asia
Fungi of Europe
Fungi of North America